Jeremy Harvey may refer to:

Jeremy Harvey (physicist), winner of Dirac Prize
Jeremy Harvey, character in The Leap Years

See also
Jerry Harvey (disambiguation)